Holmesville Township is a township in Becker County, Minnesota, United States. The population was 457 as of the 2000 census.

History
Holmesville Township was named for Elon G. Holmes, a state senator.

Geography

Lakes
 Balsam Lake
 Buffalo Lake (east three-quarters)
 Cotton Lake (north quarter)
 Five Lake (north edge)
 Flat Lake (west quarter)
 Little Cotton Lake
 Little Round Lake (vast majority)
 Loon Lake (northeast half)
 Momb Lake
 N Momb Lake (south quarter)
 N Twin Lake
 Pickerel Lake (north edge)
 Rice Lake
 Rochert Lake
 Rock Lake
 S Twin Lake
 Spring Lake
 Tamarack Lake (west three-quarters)
 Werk Lake

Adjacent townships
 Sugar Bush Township (northeast)
 Height of Land Township (east)
 Erie Township (south)
 Detroit Township (southwest)
 Richwood Township (west)

Cemeteries
The township contains these two cemeteries: Egelund Lutheran and Holmesville Township.

Demographics
As of the census of 2000, there were 457 people, 179 households, and 131 families residing in the township.  The population density was 16.3 people per square mile (6.3/km2).  There were 295 housing units at an average density of 10.5/sq mi (4.1/km2).  The racial makeup of the township was 93.87% White, 3.50% Native American, 0.44% from other races, and 2.19% from two or more races.

There were 179 households, out of which 27.9% had children under the age of 18 living with them, 69.8% were married couples living together, 2.2% had a female householder with no husband present, and 26.3% were non-families. 21.8% of all households were made up of individuals, and 7.8% had someone living alone who was 65 years of age or older.  The average household size was 2.55 and the average family size was 3.02.

In the township the population was spread out, with 24.5% under the age of 18, 4.6% from 18 to 24, 24.9% from 25 to 44, 32.2% from 45 to 64, and 13.8% who were 65 years of age or older.  The median age was 43 years. For every 100 females, there were 101.3 males.  For every 100 females age 18 and over, there were 104.1 males.

The median income for a household in the township was $32,500, and the median income for a family was $44,167. Males had a median income of $32,222 versus $21,071 for females. The per capita income for the township was $18,366.  About 9.1% of families and 11.6% of the population were below the poverty line, including 12.1% of those under age 18 and 2.9% of those age 65 or over.

References
 United States National Atlas
 United States Census Bureau 2007 TIGER/Line Shapefiles
 United States Board on Geographic Names (GNIS)

Townships in Becker County, Minnesota
Townships in Minnesota